Funny Games (alternatively titled Funny Games U.S.) is a 2007 psychological horror film written and directed by Michael Haneke, and a remake of his own 1997 film of the same title. Naomi Watts, Tim Roth, Michael Pitt, and Brady Corbet star in the main roles. The film is a shot-for-shot remake of the 1997 film, albeit in English and set in the United States with different actors. Like the original, the film follows a middle class family as they are captured and tortured by two young criminals on their vacation. Exterior scenes were filmed on Long Island. The film is an international co-production of the United States, United Kingdom, France, Germany, and Italy. Haneke has stated that the film is a reflection and criticism of violence used in media.

Plot
George and Ann Farber, their son Georgie, and their dog Lucky arrive at their lake house. Their next-door neighbor, Fred, is seen with two young men, Peter and Paul. They find Fred reacting somewhat awkwardly. Fred and Paul come over to help put the boat into the lake. After they leave, George and Georgie stay outside by the lake, tending to their boat. Georgie asks his father why Fred was behaving so strangely.

While Ann is in the kitchen cooking, Peter visits and asks to borrow some eggs. Ann gives him the eggs but Peter clumsily drops them. Feeling a little annoyed after Peter accidentally knocks her phone into the sink filled with water, Ann gives him another four eggs and he leaves. Soon afterwards she hears Lucky barking and finds Peter and Paul inside together. Lucky had jumped on Peter, causing him to break the second batch of eggs. Paul asks her to try out one of the golf clubs outside, and she begrudgingly agrees. In the boat, George and Georgie hear Lucky barking hysterically when suddenly the barking stops. Peter and Paul request more eggs, and Ann becomes frustrated, but George arrives and tries to force the men to leave, slapping Paul. In retaliation, Peter breaks one of George's legs with the golf club. The two young men then take the family hostage.

Paul guides Ann on a hunt to find the family's dog, which he had killed with George's golf club. When their neighbors, the Thompsons, visit, Ann passes Paul off as friends, just like what Fred had done before. After returning to the house, the Farbers are forced to participate in a number of sadistic games in order to stay alive, in hope that Fred would visit them as scheduled so they might be rescued. The two young men try to "apologize" to George, but when neglected by George and Ann, they beat them.

Paul asks if George or Ann wants to bet that they will be alive by 9:00 in the morning, and says that he and Peter are betting they will not be. Paul frequently ridicules Peter's weight and lack of intelligence, and describes a number of contradicting stories of Peter's past, although no definitive explanation is ever presented as to the men's origins or motives.

During the "games", Peter and Paul put Georgie's head in a bag and ask Ann to strip naked. Georgie is nearly suffocated until George asks Ann to follow the men's instructions. When released from the bag, Georgie escapes the house with the help of his parents. He goes to the house of Fred, where he discovers bloody corpses. Meanwhile, Paul pushes Ann, whose hands have been tied by tape behind her back, onto a sofa that is some space away from George, and ties her ankles by tape as well before going out to search for Georgie, leaving Peter to watch over the Farbers. Ann asks why they do not directly kill them, and Peter answers that they should not forget the fun of the games. When Peter goes to the kitchen to get eggs, Ann jumps to George but George fails to untape her before Peter comes back, and Peter beats her and breaks the eggs again. Ann begs Peter to let them go, but he refuses. Georgie finds a shotgun in the house of Fred and Paul tells him to go ahead and shoot him with it, but the gun fails to go off. Paul returns him to the living room, and gives the shotgun to Peter.

The men play a new game, saying whoever gets counted out will be shot. While Paul is in the kitchen getting something to eat, Georgie panics and runs, which results in Peter shooting and killing him. Paul berates Peter for being trigger-happy, and the two men decide to briefly leave. George and Ann are grief-stricken over their loss, but they eventually resolve to survive. Ann is able to free herself and flee the house while George desperately tries to make a call on the malfunctioning phone. Ann fails to find help, only to be re-captured by Peter and Paul, who bring her back to the house.

After stabbing George, they tell Ann to say a prayer before making a choice for her husband; a painful and prolonged death with the "little" knife, or a quick and brutal death with the "big" shotgun. While Paul is talking, Ann seizes the shotgun on the table in front of her and kills Peter. An enraged Paul grabs the shotgun and starts looking for the television remote. Upon finding it, he rewinds the last occurrences back to a moment before Ann grabs the shotgun, breaking the fourth wall. On the "do over", Paul snatches the shotgun away before she can grab it and admonishes her, saying she is not allowed to break the rules.

Peter and Paul kill George and take Ann, bound and gagged, out onto the family's boat. Ann tries to free herself but is caught by Paul and Peter. Around eight o'clock in the morning, Paul nonchalantly pushes her into the water to drown, thus winning their bet. They knock on the door of the Thompsons' house and request some eggs. Paul glances at the camera with a smirk.

Cast
Naomi Watts as Ann Farber
Tim Roth as George Farber
Devon Gearhart as Georgie Farber
Michael Pitt as Paul
Brady Corbet as Peter
Boyd Gaines as Fred, the Farbers' neighbor
Siobhan Fallon Hogan as Betsy Thompson
Robert LuPone as Robert Thompson
Susanne Haneke as Betsy's sister-in-law
Linda Moran as Eve

For 2007's American remake, the character of Gerda was renamed "Betsy", the second family to fall victim to Paul and Peter were given the surname "Farber" and the third family were given the surname "Thompson".

Development
Michael Haneke wanted to make a film set in the United States, but for practical reasons he had to set the original 1997 film in Austria.

After the 2007 film used the same house including props and tones, Robert Koehler of Cineaste wrote that this "proves for certain that—whether he uses the great cinematographer Jurgen Jurges (for the 1997 version) or the great Darius Khondji (for the new film)—Haneke is fundamentally his own cinematographer exercising considerable control over the entire look of his films."

Release
The film made its British premiere at the London Film Festival on 20 October 2007. Its United States premiere was at the 2008 Sundance Film Festival on 19 January 2008. It began a limited release in the United States and Canada on 14 March 2008, distributed by Warner Independent. A wider release to more theaters came on 8 April 2008. The film was shown at the Istanbul Film Festival in April 2008. It did not receive a wide theatrical release in the United States before coming out on DVD. Funny Games was a box office failure, grossing a little more than half of its $15 million budget. Guardian writer Geoffrey Macnab included Funny Gamess lack of success among the reasons for the closure of Tartan Films, which co-produced the film and released it in the United Kingdom. In Germany, the film was released under the title "Funny Games U.S.".

The film's poster, done by Akiko Stehrenberger, is considered by professional poster designer Adrian Curry to be his favorite film poster of the 2000s.

Home media
The DVD was released on 10 June 2008, in the US. The DVD does not contain any extra material but instead it includes both widescreen and full screen editions on one disc. In the UK, the DVD and Blu-ray were released on 28 July with the extra material being the original theatrical trailer, Q&A with producers Hamish McAlpine and Chris Coen, interviews with the cast, viral video clips and film notes.

Themes
Haneke states that the entire film was not intended to be a horror film. He says he wanted to make a message about violence in the media by making an incredibly violent, but otherwise pointless movie. He had written a short essay revealing how he felt on the issue, called "Violence + Media." The essay is included as a chapter in the book A Companion to Michael Haneke.

Reception
The film received mixed reviews from critics. The review aggregator Rotten Tomatoes reported that 52% of critics gave the film positive reviews, based on 144 reviews. The website's critical consensus reads, "Though made with great skill, Funny Games is nevertheless a sadistic exercise in chastising the audience." Metacritic reported the film had an average score of 44 out of 100, based on 33 reviews, indicating "mixed or average reviews".

Todd Gilchrist from IGN called the film "Unrelenting and brilliant, Funny Games is a truly great film – an incisive, artistic triumph that doubles as a remarkably thrilling and unique cinematic experience." Conversely, Joshua Rothkopf from Time Out New York called the film "a sour project that defines anti-imaginative." A.O. Scott of The New York Times wrote: "At least with the remake Funny Games, Mr. Haneke shows a certain kinship with someone like Eli Roth, whose Hostel movies have brought nothing but scorn from responsible critics." The Chicago Sun-Times review of 14 March 2008 gave the film a mere half-star out of a possible four.

The Times of London ranked it #25 on its 100 Worst Films of 2008 list, calling it "art-house torture porn."

Soundtrack
The music in the introduction and the closing credits is "Bonehead" by the band Naked City from the album Torture Garden.

See also
 List of films featuring home invasions

References

External links
 
 
 
 
 

2007 films
2007 crime thriller films
2007 psychological thriller films
American crime thriller films
French crime thriller films
English-language French films
British crime thriller films
German crime thriller films
English-language German films
Films set in the United States
Italian crime thriller films
English-language Italian films
Films directed by Michael Haneke
American remakes of foreign films
Films shot in New York (state)
Home invasions in film
American serial killer films
Film4 Productions films
Entertainment One films
Torture in films
English-language Austrian films
Remakes of Austrian films
Shot-for-shot remakes
2000s English-language films
2000s American films
2000s British films
2000s French films
2000s German films